Weyburn-Big Muddy is a provincial electoral district for the Legislative Assembly of Saskatchewan, Canada. Located in southeastern Saskatchewan, the constituency was created through the Representation Act, 1994 (Saskatchewan) by combining most of the Weyburn district with part of Bengough-Milestone. The "Weyburn" riding was once represented by former CCF Premier, and federal NDP leader, Tommy Douglas.

The largest centre in the constituency is the city of Weyburn (pop. 9,433). Smaller communities in the district include the towns of Willow Bunch, Coronach, Ogema and Bengough; and the villages of Minton, Pangman and Mctaggart.

Members of the Legislative Assembly

Election results

|-

|-
 
|New Democratic Party
|Ken Kessler
|align="right"|1,517
|align="right"|22.12
|align="right"|-3.03
|-

|- bgcolor="white"
!align="left" colspan=3|Total
!align="right"|6,860
!align="right"|100.00
!align="right"|

|-

|-
 
|New Democratic Party
|Sharon Elliott
|align="right"|2,060
|align="right"|25.15
|align="right"|+1.30
|-
 
|Liberal
|Colleen Christopherson-Cote
|align="right"|1,004
|align="right"|12.26
|align="right"|-14.88
|-

|- bgcolor="white"
!align="left" colspan=3|Total
!align="right"|8,190
!align="right"|100.00
!align="right"|

|-

|-
 
|New Democratic Party
|Sherry Leach
|align="right"|3,491
|align="right"|40.64
|align="right"|+5.66
|-
 
|Liberal
|Janet Ledingham
|align="right"|1,223
|align="right"|14.24
|align="right"|-2.33
|- bgcolor="white"
!align="left" colspan=3|Total
!align="right"|8,590
!align="right"|100.00
!align="right"|

|-

|-
 
|New Democratic Party
|Judy Bradley
|align="right"|2,899
|align="right"|34.98
|align="right"|-7.19
|-
 
|Liberal
|Joseph Weisgerber
|align="right"|1,373
|align="right"|16.57
|align="right"|-11.98
|- bgcolor="white"
!align="left" colspan=3|Total
!align="right"|8,287
!align="right"|100.00
!align="right"|

|-
 
|New Democratic Party
|Judy Bradley
|align="right"|3,506
|align="right"|42.17
|align="right"|*
|-
 
|Prog. Conservative
|Brenda Bakken
|align="right"|2,434
|align="right"|29.28
|align="right"|*
|-
 
|Liberal
|Hugh Kimball
|align="right"|2,373
|align="right"|28.55
|align="right"|*
|- bgcolor="white"
!align="left" colspan=3|Total
!align="right"|8,313
!align="right"|100.00
!align="right"|

2006 by-election

In February 2006, the constituency's seat became vacant when the current member, Brenda Bakken Lackey (Saskatchewan Party) tendered her resignation.  On May 19, 2006, Premier Calvert announced a by-election for the seat, to be held on June 19, 2006.

The candidates were:
Graham Mickleborough raised on a family farm in the Rose Plain district of Saskatchewan, was the candidate running for the NDP. He lives and works in Weyburn as the government appointed CEO and President of Weyburn Regional College.
Dustin Duncan, born and raised in Weyburn, was the Saskatchewan Party candidate. He resided in Regina and worked in the SP legislative caucus office prior to the by-election.
Liberal leader David Karwacki who was raised in Saskatoon and was the Liberal Party candidate.  David is an entrepreneur and founder of Star Produce Ltd.

The Saskatchewan Party won the constituency by a considerably wider margin than it had in the 2003 Saskatchewan general election, although the party only managed to increase its share of the vote by a modest four percentage points (this swing would be enough for a Saskatchewan Party majority if it were repeated provincewide in the next general election).  The Liberal Party was able to gain more support than the NDP, although that may well have been due to the candidacy of their leader. 

Compared to typical Saskatchewan by-elections, voter turnout was high.

|-

|-
 
|Liberal
|David Karwacki
|align="right"|1,985
|align="right"|27.14%
|align="right"|+12.90%
|-
 
|New Democratic Party
|Graham Mickleborough
|align="right"|1,745
|align="right"|23.85%
|align="right"|-16.79%
|- bgcolor="white"
!align="left" colspan=3|Total
!align="right"|7,315
!align="right"|100.00%
!align="right"|0.1%

Source: Elections Saskatchewan: Constituency Vote Summaries – Historical

Members of the Legislative Assembly

References

External links 
Website of the Legislative Assembly of Saskatchewan
Elections Saskatchewan: Official Results of the 2007 Provincial Election By Electoral Division
Elections Saskatchewan - Official Results of the 2011 Provincial Election
Saskatchewan Archives Board – Saskatchewan Election Results By Electoral Division

Saskatchewan provincial electoral districts
Weyburn